Inge Marschall is Czech-born German model and film and television actress.

Selected filmography
 Go for It, Baby (1968)
 Old Barge, Young Love (1973)
 Auch ich war nur ein mittelmäßiger Schüler (1974)
 Spring Symphony (1983)
 Der Fahnder (1997)

References

Bibliography

External links

1943 births
Living people
German film actresses
German television actresses
German female models